Verticordia aurea, commonly known as buttercups is a flowering plant in the myrtle family, Myrtaceae and is endemic to the south-west of Western Australia. It is a slender, sometimes bushy shrub with a single stem at the base, cylindrical leaves and heads of scented, golden-yellow flowers in spring.

Description
The leaves have a pointed end.

Flowering time is from September to December.

The species is closely allied to Verticordia nitens and V. patens, the three members of Verticordia sect. Chrysorhoe, from which it is most easily distinguished by its larger, more deeply yellow or golden flowers.

Taxonomy and naming
Verticordia aurea was first formally described by Alex George in 1991 and the description was published in Nuytsia from specimens collected south of Eneabba. The specific epithet (aurea) is derived from the Latin word aurum meaning "gold" referring to the colour of the flowers.

George placed this species in subgenus Chrysoma, section Chrysorhoe along with V. patens and V. nitens.

Distribution and habitat
This verticordia grows in deep sand, usually in association with other verticordias, in heath, shrubland or woodland with Eucalyptus todtiana, Banksia menziesii and Xylomelum angustifolium. It is known from scattered areas between Eneabba, Lake Indoon and the Green Head - Coorow Road, within  of Eneabba  in the Geraldton Sandplains biogeographic region.

Ecology
The flowers are not attractive to typical insect pollinators, except for a single species of solitary bee  Euryglossa aureophila (Colletidae), previously Euhesma aureophila, which feeds on nectar, pollen, and the oil released from the anthers.

Conservation
Verticordia argentea is classified as "Priority Four" by the Western Australian Government Department of Parks and Wildlife, meaning that is rare or near threatened.

Use in horticulture
In cultivation V. aurea is a bushy shrub with colourful flowers, making it an attractive garden plant, but it has proven difficult to grow, except in Western Australia in deep sand in an open sunny location. In other conditions it is susceptible to fungal attack. It can be propagated from cuttings.

References

aurea
Rosids of Western Australia
Eudicots of Western Australia
Plants described in 1991